Benjamin Thall is an American actor and is most well known for his role in the movie Homeward Bound: The Incredible Journey as Peter Burnford.

Life and career
Benj Thall was born in New York. His career kicked off in the 1990 comedy Repossessed where he played Ned Aglet. He has produced, directed and written various short films up to the present day. He is well known for his role as Peter Burnford in Homeward Bound: The Incredible Journey and in the sequel Homeward Bound II: Lost in San Francisco.

Filmography

Film
Repossessed (1990) - Ned Aglet
The Haunted (TV Movie) (1991) Kid Torkelson
Homeward Bound: The Incredible Journey (1993) - Peter Burnford
The Puppet Masters (1994) Jeff
Homeward Bound II: Lost in San Francisco (1996) - Peter Burnford
The Prime Gig (2000) - Tolstoy
Bet on Red (2014)

Television
The Torkelsons (TV Series) (pilot) (1991) - Steve Floyd
Greek Times (TV series) (Recurring cast) (1992) - Jason

Produced and directed
Penny (Short Film) (2010) (Director and Producer)
Weird But True News (Television Film) (2015)
The Secret Admirer (Short Film) (2017)

References

External links

American male film actors
American male television actors
American male voice actors
Living people
Male actors from New York City
Year of birth missing (living people)